The Church of St Michael and All Angels is a church in Brooksby, Leicestershire. It is a Grade II* listed building.

History
The church lies within the grounds of Brooksby Hall. The church consists of a tower, chancel and nave. The tower was built in the 14th century and has battlements, a frieze and a spire. The rest of the church is from the Perpendicular period and late Tudor period.

The church was restored R. W. Johnson in 1879. The chancel has a slab to Henry Villiers (died 1481) and his wife.

References

Brooksby
Brooksby